The Milan Furniture Fair is a furniture fair held annually in Milan. It is the largest trade fair of its kind in the world. The exhibition showcases the latest in furniture and design from countries around the world. 
It is considered a leading venue for the display of new products by designers of furniture, lighting and other home furnishings. The show, also known as "Salone", "Milano Salone" and "Milan Design Week", is held every year, usually in April, in the FieraMilano complex in the Milan metropolitan area town of Rho. Besides the Salone, in April every odd year Euroluce exhibition takes place and every even year EuroCucina and the International Bathroom Exhibition are held along the Milan Furniture Fair.

History 

The Salone Internazionale del Mobile di Milano was launched in 1961, with the original focus being Italian furniture.  The original sponsors were furniture manufacturers from the Federelegno-Arredo trade association.  The trade show grew in size over the years, allowing many of the 13,000 companies which comprised the global furniture industry to showcase their wares in a single event.

The show's annual visitation numbers 270,000, with attendees from over 150 countries worldwide. The show is now organized and operated by Cosmit S.p.A., a trade show corporation and a member of the ICSID (International Council of Societies of Industrial Design) and ADI (Association for Industrial Design). Interior design around the world gathers at Milan in April every year at Milan Design Week commonly known as Salone Internazionale del Mobile covered online at designers such as designerzcentral.

In 2011, there were 2,720 exhibitors at the official fair, compared to 2,499 in 2010. New lighting technologies at the show included the Flos 2620 LED chandelier with 2,620 LEDs in what appeared to be random rings of light arranged to create the illusion of movement. The standpoint piece for Arco, a 106-year-old Dutch company, was the wooden furniture produced by the Israeli designer Shay Alkalay. Of the student shows, the Dutch design school Design Academy Eindhoven took first place, followed by Israel's Bezalel Academy of Art and Design. Also, some early examples of the combination of sustainability and design were showcased, which eventually resulted in a British entrepreneurial initiative a few years later, pioneer of the upcoming sustainable design revolution.

In year 2018, the 57th edition of the Salone del Mobile. Milano, there were 434,509 visitors in 6 days from 188 different countries. To compare the year 2016 and 2017, it has increased 17% and 26%.

In 2020, the Salone del Mobile 59th edition was officially been cancelled due to the COVID-19 pandemic. The following edition of the fair in September 2021 will be considered the 60th anniversary.

From June 7 to 12, 2022, the 60th edition of the Salone Del Mobile Milano was held, which has been postponed due to the COVID-19 Health Crisis. In this last edition, 20 pavilions have been occupied where 2,173 exhibitors have been present (-10% compared to the 2019 edition), of which 27% are foreigners, mainly from Europe, the United States and Canada.

On this occasion, according to data from the Organization of the fair, 262,608 visitors from 173 countries have been registered, which represents a decrease of 32% compared to the last face-to-face edition, which took place in 2019.

The dates of the 61st edition will be from April 18 to 23, 2023.

https://www.icex.es/icex/es/navegacion-principal/todos-nuestros-servicios/informacion-de-mercados/estudios-de-mercados-y-otros-documentos-de-comercio-exterior/informe-feria-salone-internazionale-mobile-milan-2022-doc2022913650.html

https://www.salonemilano.it/it/articoli/insider/vi-aspettiamo-rho-fiera-apre-la-60deg-edizione-del-salone-del-mobilemilano

https://www.anieme.com/noticias/comunicados-de-anieme/salone-del-mobilemilano-cambia-sus-fechas-a-junio-de-2022/

See also 

 DesignTide
 imm Cologne (internationale möbelmesse)
 Professional Lighting Designers Association
 Tokyo designers week

References

External links

 
 Photo gallery made by a UNESCO photographer
 Website talking about the story of entrepreneurs and business owners mentoring how to start a business

Trade fairs in Italy
Furniture
Design events
Annual events in Italy
Tourist attractions in Milan